Josefina Serrador Marí (March 2, 1913 – May 24, 1964), better known as Pepita Serrador, was an Argentine film actress. She was married to the actor Narciso Ibáñez Menta the mother of the film director Narciso Ibáñez Serrador. She divorced her husband in 1947.

Biography 

In Buenos Aires he married in 1934 with the Spanish actor Narciso Ibáñez Menta, with whom he had a single son, Narciso Ibáñez Serrador, director of television programs.

As for his personal and family life, in 1940 he separated and later joined the Argentine comic actor known as Ali Salem de Baraja. Sister of the actors Esteban, Teresa and Juan Serrador. He also had another sister, Nora. First obtained some successes with works that later would become classics like Bodas de sangre, La salvaje or some time later Approved in innocence written by his son "Chicho", under the pseudonym Luis Peñafiel. He made great roles in films such as Women who work and Girls who study.

She died at 51 years old victim of cancer. She expressed as a last wish, her desire to be buried in Granada, where her remains rest in the San José Cemetery.

Filmography

References

Bibliography
 Antonio Lazaro-Reboll. Spanish Horror Film. Edinburgh University Press, 2012.

External links

1913 births
1964 deaths
Argentine film actresses
20th-century Argentine actresses
People from Buenos Aires